Speranza austrinata is a species of geometrid moth in the family Geometridae. It was described by Douglas C. Ferguson in 2008 and is found in Central and North America.

The MONA or Hodges number for Speranza austrinata is 6301.1.

References

 Ferguson, Douglas C.; Hodges, R. W.; et al., eds. (2008). "Geometroidea: Geometridae (part), Ennominae (Part - Abraxini, Cassymini, Macariini)". The Moths of North America North of Mexico, fasc. 17.2, 430.
 Ferris C. (2010). "A revision of the genus Antepione Packard with description of the new genus Pionenta Ferris (Lepidoptera, Geometridae, Ennominae)". ZooKeys 71: 49-70.

Further reading

 Arnett, Ross H. (2000). American Insects: A Handbook of the Insects of America North of Mexico. CRC Press.

External links

 Butterflies and Moths of North America

Macariini
Moths described in 2008